C.H.U.D. II: Bud the C.H.U.D. is a 1989 zombie comedy film, directed by David Irving, written by M. Kane Jeeves and stars Brian Robbins, Tricia Leigh Fisher, Bianca Jagger, and Gerrit Graham in the title role.

Plot
At the start of the film, the US Government has ordered a branch of the US Military to discontinue tests concerning "the C.H.U.D. project," which is built around the idea that enzymes taken from the sewer dwelling creatures from C.H.U.D. can make hyper-effective killing machines in the army. Bud Oliver, the last specimen of the experiment, who has come to be known as "Bud the C.H.U.D.," is hidden away in a Centers for Disease Control office in a small American town, from which a trio of bungling teenagers steal him, and accidentally reawaken him in doing so. Bud escapes and begins to forge an army of C.H.U.D.s.

Cast
Brian Robbins as Steve Williams
Bill Calvert as Kevin
Tricia Leigh Fisher as Katie Norton
Gerrit Graham as Bud Oliver, a.k.a. Bud the C.H.U.D.
Robert Vaughn as Colonel Masters
Larry Cedar as Graves
Bianca Jagger as Velma
Larry Linville as Dr. Jewell
Jack Riley as Wade Williams
Sandra Kerns as Melissa Williams
June Lockhart as Gracie
Norman Fell as Tyler
Rich Hall as Stan
Robert Symonds as Proctor
Priscilla Pointer as Dr. Berlin
Marvin J. McIntyre as a farmer
Ritch Shydner as the mailman
Clive Revill as Dr. Kellaway
Michael Bell as Mr. Williams
Robert Englund as Man in Trenchcoat Walking with Trick-or-Treaters (uncredited cameo)

Production
It is a loose sequel to C.H.U.D., mostly in name though the ties do carry on into dialogue and plot. As in the first film, C.H.U.D. stands for "Cannibalistic Humanoid Underground Dweller", but the alternative acronym (Contamination Hazard Urban Disposal) is not carried over.

The film was written by Ed Naha, who had previously written Honey, I Shrunk the Kids, under the pseudonym M Kane Jeeves, similar to the pseudonym Mahatma Kane Jeeves used by W. C. Fields.

Release
Originally intended for a theatrical release, the movie was released on VHS and laserdisc by Vestron Video on September 27, 1989.

In 2003, a DVD was released in the United Kingdom. In the U.S., the film is currently available on DVD from Lionsgate as part of an 8 horror movie DVD set. The film screened in June 2009 as Video on Demand at FEARnet. A Blu-ray release was released on November 22, 2016 by Lionsgate as part of their Vestron Video Collector's Series line.

References in popular culture

 Rap group Sticks Downey published a special Halloween track in 2010, based on the plot of C.H.U.D. II: Bud the C.H.U.D., using the movie's theme song as backing track and including dialog excerpts from the movie.

References

External links
 
 
 

1989 films
1989 horror films
1980s monster movies
American comedy horror films
American monster movies
American natural horror films
American zombie comedy films
American sequel films
Direct-to-video comedy films
Direct-to-video horror films
Vestron Pictures films
Films scored by Nicholas Pike
1980s English-language films
1980s American films